Tribal Youth Federation (in Bengali Upajati Juba Federation) is an organization affiliated to Democratic Youth Federation of India in Tripura. TYF organizes youth from the tribal populations of the state. TYF has a separate central committee and publishes Bini Kharad (Our Voice). The supreme body of TYF is the Central Conference.

TYF works in close coordination with Ganamukti Parishad and is often considered as the youth wing of GMP.

TYF was founded in 1967 to counter the influence of Tripura Upajati Juba Samiti.

Activities 
 14 September 2014:  TYF rejected IPFT's Demand separate state in a press conference.
 13 August 2019: TYF organised a convention with 10 point demand in agartala Town Hall.
 17 September 2019: Tribal Youth Federation demanding jobs for youth unemployment and address a massive rally in Tripura.
 17 January 2020: Tribal Youth Federation (TYF) demand immediate release of former minister Badal Chowdhury.

See also 
 Democratic Youth Federation of India
 Ganamukti Parishad
 Communist Party of India (Marxist)

References

External links 
 official Facebook Page of TYF
 http://www.tripurainfoway.com/news-details/TN/21128/tribal-youth-federation-to-start-membership-drive-from-march-8-ipft-and-inpt-masks-of-nlft-rsquo.html

Youth wings of communist parties of India
Organisations based in Tripura
1967 establishments in Tripura
Organizations established in 1967